Riccardo Orsolini (born 24 January 1997) is an Italian professional footballer who plays as a winger for  club Bologna and the Italy national team.

Club career
Orsolini is a product of Ascoli's youth academy. He made his debut with the first team in the 2015–16 season in Serie B, obtaining 9 appearances in the league.

On 30 January 2017, Orsolini joined Juventus on a contract until June 2021, for a fee of €6 million, plus an extra €4 million dependent on certain conditions. However Orsolini remains in Ascoli Piceno until the end of the season.

On 14 July 2017, Orsolini joined Atalanta on a two-year loan.

Orsolini moved back to Juve and then on loan to Bologna F.C. 1909 in a January 2018 after making just substitute appearances for Atalanta. The loan is for 18 months with an option to buy. On 19 June 2019, Orsolini signed a deal with Bologna and signed the club on permanent basis.

International career
With the Italy U-20 side, Orsolini took part at the 2017 FIFA U-20 World Cup, and led the tournament in goals, scoring five, as Italy finished the competition in third place, their best ever result. Due to his prolific performances, he was named by many in the media as the outright best player on the Italian side.

He made his debut with the Italy U21 team on 1 September 2017, under manager Luigi Di Biagio, in a 3–0 friendly defeat against Spain.

Orsolini made his senior international debut for Italy on 18 November 2019, under manager Roberto Mancini, coming on as a substitute for Nicolò Barella in a 9–1 home win over Armenia, in Italy's final Euro 2020 qualifier; he marked the occasion by scoring his first international goal, and also later provided an assist for Federico Chiesa's goal.

Style of play
Orsolini is a physically strong and fast-paced winger, who excels in one on one situations due to his excellent dribbling ability. Although he is naturally left-footed, he prefers to play on the right flank, in either a 4–3–3 or 4–2–3–1 formation, a position which allows him to cut into the centre and shoot on goal with his stronger foot.

Career statistics

Club

International

International goals
Scores and results list Italy's goal tally first.

Honours

International
Italy U20
FIFA U-20 World Cup bronze medal: 2017

Individual
FIFA U-20 World Cup Golden Boot: 2017 (5 goals)

References

External links

 
 

1997 births
People from Ascoli Piceno
Sportspeople from the Province of Ascoli Piceno
Living people
Italian footballers
Italy under-21 international footballers
Italy youth international footballers
Italy international footballers
Serie A players
Serie B players
Ascoli Calcio 1898 F.C. players
Atalanta B.C. players
Bologna F.C. 1909 players
Juventus F.C. players
Association football wingers
Footballers from Marche